Lithuanian Neighbouring Rights Association, known as AGATA, is a non-profit performance rights organization established in 1999 that deals with the licensing and rights of music publishers and performers in Lithuania. In 2011, it became the country's designated body for the collection of compensation for writers, performers, actors and producers. AGATA is an associated member of the International Federation of the Phonographic Industry (IFPI). Since September 2018, AGATA publishes weekly top 100 charts of the most popular albums and singles in Lithuania. The charts are based on sales and streams from Spotify, Deezer, Apple Music, iTunes, Google Play and Shazam.

References

External links
 AGATA Weekly Lithuanian Top 100 Albums and Singles

Music industry associations
Lithuanian music
Record charts
1999 establishments in Lithuania
Organizations based in Vilnius
Non-profit organizations based in Lithuania